Lidholm is a Swedish surname. Notable people with the surname include:

David Lidholm (born 1982), Swedish footballer
Ingvar Lidholm (1921–2017), Swedish composer
Matt Benson-Lidholm (born 1952), Australian politician

Swedish-language surnames